is a Japanese company manufacturing optical products such as photomasks, photomask blanks and hard disk drive platters, contact lenses and eyeglass lenses for the health-care market, medical photonics, lasers, photographic filters, medical flexible endoscopy equipment, and software. Hoya Corporation is one of the Forbes Global 2000 Leading Companies and Industry Week 1000 Company.

History of Hoya-Pentax merger
Hoya discussed a merger with Pentax into Hoya Pentax HD Corporation during 2007. Hoya's primary goal was to strengthen its medical-related business by taking advantage of Pentax's technologies and expertise in the field of endoscopes, intraocular lenses, surgical loupes, biocompatible ceramics, etc. It was speculated that Pentax's camera business could be sold off after the merger. The merger was initially intended to be completed by October 1, 2007. However, Pentax management decided to not pursue the originally planned share swap, and other options for a merger were discussed. On May 25, the Pentax board of directors accepted Hoya's offer for a merger. On August 6, 2007, Hoya completed a friendly takeover bid for Pentax and acquired 90.59% of the company. On October 29, 2007, Hoya and Pentax announced that Pentax, as the company ceasing to exist, will merge with and into Hoya on March 31, 2008.

The acquired Pentax surveying instrument business (later IT Asahi Co., Ltd.) and camera business (now Pentax Ricoh Imaging Co., Ltd.) were sold to Taiwan Instrument Co., Ltd. in 2009 and Ricoh Co., Ltd. in 2011, respectively.

ReadSpeaker
On July 13, 2017, it was announced that the HOYA had acquired ReadSpeaker. ReadSpeaker was founded in 1999 and headquartered in Huis ter Heide, Utrecht in the Netherlands at the time of the acquisition. ReadSpeaker is a text-to-speech technology that allows users to highlight words that are being spoken, and users can save the speech in an MP3 format. It has been used to transform websites to speech. The International Herald Tribune employed the tool to turn into podcasts the stories it publishes online. In a paper for the 2016 International Conference on Software Process Improvement, José Ortega and his coauthors said, ReadSpeaker "works 100% online, is a good reference but is commercial and costs".

See also

 List of companies of Japan

References

External links

 
  Wiki collection of bibliographic works on Hoya Corporation

Photography companies of Japan
Electronics companies of Japan
Manufacturing companies based in Tokyo
Glassmaking companies of Japan
Lens manufacturers
Contact lenses
Companies listed on the Tokyo Stock Exchange
Technology companies established in 1941
1941 establishments in Japan
Optics manufacturing companies
Japanese brands
Midori-kai
Eyewear companies of Japan
Medical technology companies of Japan